Piotr Piechniak (born 9 March 1977 in Stalowa Wola) is a Polish former professional footballer who played as a winger.

Career

National team
From 2003 to 2007, Piechniak played for the Poland national football team.

Club
In June 2010, he joined GKS Katowice. He was released one year later.

In July 2011, he signed a one-year contract with Resovia.

References

External links
 
 

1977 births
Living people
People from Stalowa Wola
Polish footballers
Poland international footballers
Stal Stalowa Wola players
Dyskobolia Grodzisk Wielkopolski players
Obra Kościan players
Polonia Warsaw players
Levadiakos F.C. players
Odra Wodzisław Śląski players
GKS Katowice players
Ekstraklasa players
Sportspeople from Podkarpackie Voivodeship
Association football midfielders
Polish expatriate footballers
Expatriate footballers in Greece
Polish expatriate sportspeople in Greece